Lydian is a Unicode block containing characters for writing the Lydian language of ancient Anatolia.

History
The following Unicode-related documents record the purpose and process of defining specific characters in the Lydian block:

References 

Unicode blocks